Bob Stockham (born December 20, 1970) is a former American football quarterback who played one season with the Portland Forest Dragons of the Arena Football League. He played college football at the University of Nevada, Las Vegas.

References

External links
Just Sports Stats
College stats

Living people
1970 births
Players of American football from St. Petersburg, Florida
American football quarterbacks
UNLV Rebels football players
Portland Forest Dragons players
Santa Rosa Bear Cubs football players